Tyohaar Ki Thaali is an Indian television series that airs on The EPIC Channel and takes viewers through various festivals celebrated in India. Tyohaar Ki Thaali is a show that offers a delectable mix of stories and recipes hosted by Sakshi Tanwar. The show is also available on EPIC ON (EPIC TV's online video streaming platform).

Show summary 
Tyohaar Ki Thaali is a show that offers a delectable mix of stories and recipes hosted by Sakshi Tanwar. In this show, Sakshi Tanwar celebrates Indias's festivals by sharing her long cherished, heirloom recipes of various bhogs and prasads identified with the Gods. Peppered with folklores, legends and Sakshi's personal anecdotes.

Show themes 

 Episode 1 – Ganesh Chaturthi
 Episode 2 – Onam
 Episode 3 – Anant Chaturdashi
 Episode 4 – Eid al-Adha
 Episode 5 – Navratri
 Episode 6 – Dusshera
 Episode 7 – Karwa Chauth
 Episode 8 – Chhoti Diwali
 Episode 9 – Diwali
 Episode 10 – Chhath Puja
 Episode 11 – Karthik Purnima
 Episode 12 – Guru Nanak Jayanti
 Episode 13 – Satyanarayan Puja/Vrat
 Episode 14 – Ekadashi
 Episode 15 – Hanuman Vrat
 Episode 16 – Sankashti Chaturthi
 Episode 17 – Vrat Ka Khana
 Episode 18 – Paush Purnima
 Episode 19 – Christmas
 Episode 20 – New Year
 Episode 21 – Pongal
 Episode 22 – Makar Sankranti/Lohri
 Episode 23 – Vasant Panchami
 Episode 24 – Narad Stories
 Episode 25 – Kandoba and Folk Deities
 Episode 26 – Mahashivratri
 Episode 27 – Holi
 Episode 28 – Basoda
 Episode 29 – Gudi Padwa
 Episode 30 – Gangaur
 Episode 31 – Mahavir Jayanti
 Episode 32 – Easter
 Episode 33 – Baisaki
 Episode 34 – Akshaya Tritiya
 Episode 35 – Mopin Festival
 Episode 36 – Buddha Purnima
 Episode 37 - Sita 
 Episode 38 - Shavuot 
 Episode 39 - Ganga Dussehra 
 Episode 40 - Sai Baba

Guests
 Virender Sehwag
 Ram Kapoor
 Shweta Kawatra
 Kavita Kaushik

References

External links
 
 Official website

Indian cooking television series
Epic TV original programming
2017 Indian television series debuts